VII or vii may refer to: the Roman numeral 7

Art and entertainment 
 The Vii, a video game console
 vii, leading-tone triad, see diminished triad
 VII (Blitzen Trapper album)
 VII (Just-Ice album)
 VII (Teyana Taylor album)
  VII (Tresor album)
 VII: Journal of the Marion E. Wade Center
 VII Photo Agency, an international photographic cooperative
 Saw VII, the seventh film in the Saw franchise, commonly called "VII"

Other uses 
 VII, The Roman number for seven
 vii, leading-tone triad, see diminished triad
 Vii (river), a river in Romania
 Vehicle Infrastructure Integration, an R&D initiative for linking road vehicles to their physical surroundings
 Viscosity index improver
 
 Type VII Submarine, a German submarine class in World War 2

See also 
 VII Corps (disambiguation)
 Vij, a surname
 Viy (disambiguation)